Plum Bayou Mounds Archeological State Park (3 LN 42), (formerly known as "Toltec Mounds Archeological State Park") also known as Knapp Mounds, Toltec Mounds site or Toltec Mounds, is an archaeological site from the Late Woodland period in Arkansas that protects an 18-mound complex with the tallest surviving prehistoric mounds in Arkansas. The site is on the banks of Mound Lake, an oxbow lake of the Arkansas River. It was occupied by its original inhabitants from 600 to 1050 CE. The site is designated as a National Historic Landmark.

Name
The identification of the site with the Toltec of Mexico was a 19th-century mistake. It was thought that the Toltec people lived in North America and built the mounds. Mary Eliza Feild Officer Knapp was the co-owner of the land from 1849 to 1905. She and her first husband purchased the land in 1849 and the land passed to her after his death. She and her second husband made subsequent land purchases near the site. Mary was interested in archeology and had become acquainted with Dr William H. Barry who was also interested in Native American artefacts and customs. Mary entered into correspondence with Barry discussing the "Toltec Mounds" site and Barry passed her letter on to Joseph Henry, the secretary of the Smithsonian Institution. Mary would go on to correspond directly with Henry as well as forward artefacts she had collected from the site to the Smithsonian.

This would lead to investigations at the site by archaeologist Edward Palmer from the Smithsonian Institutions Bureau of American Ethnology in 1883 as well as by others which proved that the indigenous ancestors of regional Native Americans built these mounds and all other mounds within the present-day United States. They were part of mound building cultures that flourished from the Late Archaic period into the Protohistoric period. They built earthwork mounds for religious, political and ceremonial purposes, connecting them to their cosmology.

Originally, the name Plum Bayou was borrowed from a nearby waterway and applied to the distinctive culture of the site, discussed below. The site was officially renamed in November 2022 following consultation with the Quapaw Nation and the Arkansas Archaeological Survey.

Plum Bayou culture
The people who built the mounds at Plum Bayou Mounds had a culture distinct from other contemporary Native American groups in the Mississippi Valley. Plum Bayou sites are found throughout the White River and Arkansas River floodplains of central and eastern Arkansas, but are also found as far west as the eastern Ozark Mountains. Plum Bayou Mounds is the largest site of the eponymous culture. Their relationships with neighboring cultures such as the Coles Creek culture to the south and Fourche Maline culture to the southwest are still under investigation. The people lived in permanent villages and hamlets throughout the countryside. They built sturdy houses, farmed, gathered wild plants, fished, and hunted.

Plum Bayou Mounds Site

Mound groups, such as this one, were religious and social centers for people living in the surrounding countryside.  Plum Bayou Mounds itself had a small population, made up primarily of political and religious leaders of the community and their families. This center was occupied from about 600 to 1050 CE.

The other side was the lake, now called Mound Pond. Mounds were placed along the edges of two open areas (plazas) which were used for political, religious, and social activities attended by people from the vicinity. At least two mounds were used for feasting, as indicated by discarded food remains. Deer were a favorite food. Mound locations seem to have been planned using principles based on the alignment with important solar positions and standardized units of measurement. Most of the mounds were flat-topped platform mounds with buildings on them. Other Native Americans lived on the site in the 15th century, but they did not build the mounds.

The site was declared a National Historic Landmark in 1978.,

Culture, phase and chronological table for the Plum Bayou Mound site

Table taken from "Emerging Patterns of Plum Bayou Culture:Preliminary Investigations of the Toltec Mounds Research Project", by Martha Ann Rolingson, 1982.

See also
 Poverty Point
 Watson Brake

References

External links
Toltec Mounds Archeological State Park, at Arkansas State Parks

Plum Bayou culture
National Historic Landmarks in Arkansas
Native American history of Arkansas
State parks of Arkansas
Archaeological museums in Arkansas
Museums in Lonoke County, Arkansas
Former populated places in Arkansas
Protected areas of Lonoke County, Arkansas
Archaeological sites on the National Register of Historic Places in Arkansas
National Register of Historic Places in Lonoke County, Arkansas
Populated places on the National Register of Historic Places in Arkansas
Mounds in Arkansas